Dedza Central is a constituency for the National Assembly of Malawi, located in the Dedza District of Malawi's Central Region. It elects one Member of Parliament by the first past the post system. The constituency is currently represented by Malawi Congress Party MP Daniel Chiwere.

Election results

References

Constituencies of the National Assembly of Malawi